Yuma Municipal Airport  is a mile southeast of Yuma, in Yuma County, Colorado, United States. It is owned by the City of Yuma.

Facilities

 12/30: 2,900 x 40 ft (884 x 12 m), surface: asphalt/gravel
 16/34: 4,200 x 75 ft (1,280 x 23 m), surface: concrete

In the year ending December 31, 2016 the airport had 5,000 aircraft operations, all general aviation.

References

External links 
 Yuma Municipal Airport (2V6) at Colorado DOT airport directory
 

Airports in Colorado
Buildings and structures in Yuma County, Colorado
Transportation in Yuma County, Colorado